Nazi memorabilia or  Third Reich collectibles are items produced during the height of Nazism in Germany, particularly the years between 1933 and 1945. Nazi memorabilia includes a variety of objects from the material culture of Nazi Germany, especially those featuring swastikas and other Nazi symbolism and imagery  or connected to Nazi propaganda. Examples are military and paramilitary uniforms, insignia, coins and banknotes, medals, flags, daggers, guns, posters, contemporary photos, books, publications, and ephemera.

During the Second World War, soldiers from opposing Allied forces often took small items from fallen enemies as war trophies. These and other items from this time period have since been acquired by museums and individual collectors. In Europe museums still regularly receive everyday artifacts from the Nazi era and have to deal with remnants of National Socialism and relics of war and hatred.

Market 

In recent years the market for buying and selling Nazi memorabilia has increased. As veterans pass away, some families have tried to get rid of their possessions.

Many in the general public are offended by, and condemn, auctions, militaria shops, online stores and other businesses selling Nazi 'antiques', and find the goods and commercial trading 'tasteless' and 'hateful'. Most of those wanting to restrict the trade of Nazi collectibles will accept donations to public museums though. While the great majority of private collectors are exclusively interested in the historical background and fascinated by the distinctive design of the items, some collectors are in fact political supporters of Neo-Nazism and other hate groups.

With the growing demands for Nazi memorabilia, many Jewish groups are disapproving the sale and purchase of Nazi products for leisure purposes. Others such as Haim Gertner, director of Israel's Holocaust memorial Yad Vashem, believe that some of the Nazi memorabilia are worth saving, claiming that anti-Semitic history shouldn't be forgotten.

As original items from the Nazi era and Second World War are sold for high prices, there is a large amount of copies, forgeries and even inauthentic objects on the market.

Legal restrictions

The sale of Nazi memorabilia is strictly prohibited in parts of Europe. In France, the Internet portal site Yahoo! was sued in the case LICRA v. Yahoo! (2000) by the Union of Jewish Students and the International League against Racism and Anti-Semitism for "justifying war crimes and crimes against humanity" by allowing such memorabilia to be sold via its auction pages. Yahoo!'s response was to ban the sale of Nazi memorabilia through its website. A Paris court cleared Yahoo! in 2003.

Fearing similar litigation, auction website eBay enacted new guidelines regarding the sale of Nazi memorabilia in 2003. eBay's policies prohibit items relating to Nazi media propaganda, items made after 1933 that contains a swastika, Nazi reproduction items such as uniforms, and all Holocaust-related products. Memorabilia such as coins, stamps, or printed period literature such as magazines, books, or pamphlets are not prohibited.

Examples

See also

 Militaria
 Nazi propaganda
 Nazi symbolism, Bans on Nazi symbols
 Orders, decorations, and medals of Nazi Germany, Political decorations
 Nazi uniforms and insignia: Nazi Party, SS, SA, Army, Navy, Air force, Paramilitary ranks
 Reichszeugmeisterei, national material control office of Nazi Germany
 Art in Nazi Germany
 War trophy
 Nazi exploitation ( Nazisploitation)
 Nazi chic, the use of Nazi-era style, imagery, and paraphernalia in clothing and popular culture
 Nazi imagery in Thailand
 Murderabilia
 Memorabilia, Paraphernalia, Collecting
 Neo-nazism

References

External links

 Suzie Thomas, Oula Seitsonen, Vesa-Pekka Herva Nazi memorabilia, dark heritage and treasure hunting as “alternative” tourism: understanding the fascination with the material remains of World War II in Northern Finland Lapland's Dark Heritage Project, University of Helsinki, Finland
 BBC article
 Hate or History?

Historiography of Nazi Germany
Militaria
Memorabilia
Nazi propaganda